AlphaBounce is an action game similar to Breakout, developed by Motion Twin and published by Mad Monkey Studio for Nintendo DS in 2010. The game was an adaptation of a browser game of the same name.

Reception

The game received "generally favourable reviews" according to the review aggregation website Metacritic.

References

External links
 

2010 video games
Action video games
Breakout clones
DSiWare games
Nintendo DS games
Nintendo DS-only games
Video games developed in France
Multiplayer and single-player video games
Motion Twin games